Argyrotaenia hodgesi is a species of moth of the family Tortricidae. It is found in the United States, where it has been recorded from Alabama, Florida, Louisiana, Maryland, Mississippi, South Carolina and Texas.

The length of the forewings is about 5.4 mm for males and 6.4 mm for females. The forewings are buff with three irregular orange-brown fascia with a dark brown border. Adults have been recorded on wing in July and August.

References

Moths described in 1989
hodgesi
Moths of North America